Cà Mau Gas-Power-Fertilizer Complex (Vietnamese: Dự án Khí - Điện - Đạm Cà Mau) is a complex of gas pipeline, urea plant, thermal power plant in commune of Khánh An, U Minh District, Cà Mau Province, southern Vietnam. The project is located by the junction of two rivers, near to Lower U Minh National Park, a low wetland area.

Along with the Cần Thơ Bridge it is one of the largest projects in the Mekong Delta.

The 18-inch pipeline originates in PM3 gas field in the overlapping area between Malaysia and Vietnam and runs on the seabed 298 kilometers, gets landfall at Mui Tram, runs onshore 27 km to the complex. Natural gas transported through this pipeline is fed to the power plants and fertilizer plants. Total designed transportation capacity of this pipeline reaches 2 billion cubic meters per annum. The construction of this pipeline achieved completion in February 2007. Both power plants were put into operation on 27 December 2008. The contractor of the pipeline was Vietsovpetro, of the power plants was LILAMA, main equipment of power plant was supplied by Siemens.

Notes

Buildings and structures in Cà Mau province
Economy of Vietnam
Natural gas-fired power stations in Vietnam